Oscar Machapa (born 1 June 1987) is a Zimbabwean professional footballer who plays as a midfielder for CAPS United.

Parisei pazim
In January 2014, coach Ian Gorowa, invited him to be a part of the Zimbabwe squad for the 2014 African Nations Championship. He helped the team to a fourth-place finish after being defeated by Nigeria 1–0.

References

External links
 
 

Living people
1987 births
Association football midfielders
Zimbabwean footballers
Zimbabwe A' international footballers
2014 African Nations Championship players
2017 Africa Cup of Nations players
Zimbabwe international footballers